Ngwaba may be,

Ngwaba language
Chidi Ngwaba